Joba may refer to:

 Joba, member of the hip hop group Brockhampton
 Joba (given name), includes a list of people with the name
 Joba Arriba, a town in the Dominican Republic

See also
Jobas, village in Saraqib Nahiyah, Idlib, Syria
Juba (disambiguation)